Boris Bobrinskoy (25 February 1925 – 6 August 2020) was a French theologian of the Eastern Orthodox Church.

Bobrinskoy was honorary dean of the St. Sergius Orthodox Theological Institute in Paris, Rector of the Alexander Nevsky Cathedral, a mitrophore, and archpriest of the exarch of the Ecumenical Patriarchate of Constantinople.

From 1954 to 2006, Bobrinskoy was chair of dogmatic theology at the St. Sergius Orthodox Theological Institute. He was a member of the Faith and Order Commission of the World Council of Churches. He was trained in Orthodox theology as well as Catholic and Protestant theology.

The theologians who influenced Bobrinskoy include Georges Florovsky, Nicholas Afanasiev, Alexander Schmemann, and Vladimir Lossky. At the start of the 1970s, he chaired the radio association La Voix de l'orthodoxie.

Bobrinskoy was awarded an honorary doctorate of the University of Fribourg and Saint Vladimir's Orthodox Theological Seminary. He was also a knight of the Order of the Holy Sepulchre.

Bobrinskoy was married to Hélène Disterlo, with whom he had three children and multiple grandchildren. He died in Bussy-en-Othe on 6 August 2020 at the age of 95.

Publications
Communion du Saint-Esprit (1992)
Le Mystère de la Trinité (1996)
La Compassion du Père (2000)
La Vie liturgique (2000)
Le Mystère de l'Église (2003)
Je suis venu jeter le Feu sur la terre (2003)

References

1925 births
2020 deaths
Clergy from Paris
French people of Russian descent
National and Kapodistrian University of Athens alumni
Eastern Orthodox theologians
French theologians
Eastern Orthodox writers
Eastern Orthodox Christians from France
20th-century Eastern Orthodox priests
21st-century Eastern Orthodox priests